The Fan is a 1996 American sports psychological thriller film directed by Tony Scott, and starring Robert De Niro and Wesley Snipes, based on  the 1995 novel by Peter Abrahams. The film received generally negative reviews from critics and was a box office flop. Over time, the direction, the performances and the soundtrack were praised.

Plot

Gil Renard is a troubled baseball fan whose favorite team, the San Francisco Giants, have just signed a $40 million contract with his favorite player, Bobby Rayburn. His ex-wife Ellen obtains a restraining order to keep him away from herself and their son after Gil left his son to attend a sales meeting, but finds his client is at a baseball game. Gil is fired from his job as a knife salesman when he threatens a prospective customer.

Gil begins obsessing over Rayburn. When Rayburn suffers a chest injury that causes fans to be upset by his underperformance, Gil antagonizes fans that jeer him. Rayburn has also been in an open conflict with teammate Juan Primo due to both men using jersey number 11, and neither wanting to give it up, due to their long histories and connections to the number.  Rayburn was instead given number 33, and harshly protested it.  This culminates in a fight in the restroom of a bar.  Gil, thinking that Primo is to blame for Rayburn's performance, confronts him in a hotel sauna in an attempt to persuade him to let Rayburn have the number.  Primo reveals his shoulder, branded with the number 11, and says that it is his number.  This eventually leads to a struggle, and Gil stabs Primo to death. Although Rayburn is suspected of the murder, his performance improves, and Gil believes that what he did benefited Rayburn and the team. After feeling guilty about Primo's death, Rayburn starts playing well again.

Thinking that Rayburn does not acknowledge his fans, Gil goes to Rayburn's beach house and saves his son Sean from drowning. Gil persuades Rayburn to play a friendly game of catch on the beach. Rayburn says he stopped caring about the game after Primo's death, because he felt there were more important things in life. He mistakenly tells Gil that he has lost respect for the fans, remarking on their fickle nature — when he's hitting, they love him, but when he's not, they hate him. An angered Gil almost hits Rayburn with a fastball and launches into a diatribe. Rayburn is disturbed, especially when Gil takes off his jacket to reveal Rayburn's uniform underneath and wonders if Rayburn is happy that Primo's not around.

Rayburn soon discovers that Gil has kidnapped Sean and left the piece of Primo's branded shoulder in the freezer. Disillusioned with Rayburn's disrespect toward the fans, Gil spirals further into insanity and acts as though Sean is his own son. He drives to see an old friend, Coop, a catcher that Gil spoke often of playing baseball with in his past. Coop tries to help Sean escape, and reveals that the only time he and Gil ever played together was in  Little League. Gil then beats Coop to death with a baseball bat and takes Sean to a baseball field, hiding him there.

Gil contacts Rayburn to make one demand: hit a home run in the upcoming game and dedicate it to Gil, or he will kill his son. With the police on high alert, Gil enters Candlestick Park in the midst of an on-and-off thunderstorm. Rayburn struggles with his emotions while at bat. After several pitches, he finally hits the ball deep into the outfield but not over the fence. Rayburn attempts to score an inside-the-park home run. He is called out, even though he is obviously safe. Rayburn argues with the umpire, who turns out to be Gil in disguise.

Rayburn knocks Gil to the ground. Dozens of cops and Giants players swarm onto the field and confront Gil. Before the cops arrive, Gil stabs another player, Lanz, who tries to tackle him. Despite warnings from the police, Gil goes into an exaggerated pitching motion with a knife in hand. He asks Rayburn if he cares about baseball, then assumes that he cares "just a little bit." Gil is shot dead as he is about to throw the knife. Police discover Sean at the Little League field, where Gil once played in his childhood. They uncover his obsession with Rayburn, as hundreds of newspaper clippings adorn the deranged fan's hideout. A picture on the wall shows Gil in his past glory, playing Little League baseball and winning a game.

Cast

 Robert De Niro as Gil Renard / Curly
 Wesley Snipes as Bobby Rayburn
 Benicio del Toro as Juan Primo
 John Leguizamo as Manny
 Patti D'Arbanville as Ellen Renard
 Ellen Barkin as Jewel Stern
 Charles Hallahan as Coop
 Brandon Hammond as Sean Rayburn
 Andrew J. Ferchland as Richie Renard
 Chris Mulkey as Tim (Richie's stepfather)
 John Kruk as Lanz, one of Rayburn's teammates
 Dan Butler as Garrity (Gil's boss)
 Kurt Fuller as Bernie (Jewel's co-worker)
 Stanley DeSantis as Stoney 
 Don S. Davis as Stook, Giants' manager
 Michael Jace as a ticket scalper
 M. C. Gainey as a Giants fan
 Aaron Neville as himself (opening game singer)
 Jack Black as a radio broadcast technician

Music

Soundtrack

The Fan is the soundtrack to the 1996 film, The Fan. It was released on August 20, 1996, through TVT Records and was a combination of electronic and hip hop music.

Track listing
"Did You Mean What You Said?"- 3:49 (Sovory, Michael Mishaw, Marc Antoine)
"Letting Go"- 5:35 (Terence Trent D'Arby)
"Unstoppable"- 3:46 (Mic Geronimo)
"Hymn of the Big Wheel"- 6:34 (Massive Attack)
"I've Had Enough"- 2:43 (Kenny Wayne Shepherd)
"Little Bob"- 5:35 (Black Grape)
"Border Song (Holy Moses)"- 3:37 (Raymond Myles)
"What's Goin' Down"- 4:18 (Honky)
"Deliver Me"- 3:58 (Foreskin 500)
"Forever Ballin'"- 4:24 (Big Syke & Johnny "J")
"I'm da Man- 5:24 (Jeune)
"Sacrifice"- 19:08 (Hans Zimmer)

Reception

Box office
The film brought in $18,626,419 in the United States and Canada. The opening weekend brought in $6,271,406 and then dropped down 47.2% the subsequent weekend.

Critical response
On Rotten Tomatoes the film has an approval rating of 37% based on reviews from 30 critics. The website's critics' consensus states: "Tony Scott's visceral flash proves to be an ill fit for The Fan, a queasy tale of obsession that succeeds at making audiences uncomfortable, but strikes out when it comes to delivering the thrills." On Metacritic, the film has a weighted average score of 32 out of 100 based on reviews from 16 critics, indicating "generally unfavorable reviews." Audiences surveyed by CinemaScore gave the film a grade "B−" on scale of A+ to F.

See also
 List of American films of 1996

References

External links
 

1996 films
1990s psychological thriller films
1990s sports films
American psychological thriller films
1990s English-language films
American baseball films
Films about fandom
Films about stalking
Films based on American thriller novels
Films directed by Tony Scott
Films scored by Hans Zimmer
Films set in San Francisco
Films set in the San Francisco Bay Area
Mandalay Pictures films
Films shot in San Francisco
San Francisco Giants
Scott Free Productions films
TriStar Pictures films
1990s American films